West Farndon is a hamlet and deserted medieval village about  southwest of Hinton, Northamptonshire, in the civil parish of Woodford cum Membris.

Archaeology and history
Sherds of second- and third-century Roman pottery have been found west of the present hamlet, indicating the site of a Roman settlement.

The Domesday Book of 1086 records two small manors at West Farndon. Surviving earthworks east and south of the present hamlet show the extent of the former village. In 1760 an inclosure act ended Hinton's open field system of farming, and by 1840 much of the former village was deserted. Much of the ridge and furrow pattern of the common fields is still visible.

Amenities
The Jurassic Way long distance footpath passes through West Farndon.

References

Sources

External links

Deserted medieval villages in Northamptonshire
West Northamptonshire District